Trevil Halt railway station was a station on the London and North Western Railway's Heads of the Valleys line serving the village of Trefil in the Welsh county of Monmouthshire.

History
The line was leased and operated by the London and North Western Railway which acquired the smaller railway company on 30 June 1866.

Trevil opened with the extension of the line on 1 March 1864. The village had a long association with tramroads, the Trevil Rail Road having been established in May 1793 and operating from 1797. The Sirhowy Tramroad ran southwards to Sirhowy Ironworks. The Rassa Railroad ran from Trevil limestone quarries to the north-east, under the Merthyr and Abergavenny line, and to the Beaufort Ironworks. The works and five collieries comprising  of private mineral lines were purchased by Richard Thomas & Co. in 1935.

Trevil station was in an isolated location, situated just to the south of the Castle Inn. It had two platforms, the main brick-built station building and house being situated on the Down platform. No goods yard was provided but parcels were handled and private sidings were provided in connection with the Beaufort Ironworks which ran parallel with the Sirhowy Tramway. These sidings lasted until May 1938. At the same time, the station's signal box was replaced by a frame in the bay window of the station house in order to maintain the block post.

As a result of decline in the local industry and the costs of working the line between Abergavenny and Merthyr, passenger services ended on 4 January 1958. The last public service over the line was an SLS railtour on 5 January 1958 hauled by LNWR 0-8-0 49121 and LNWR 0-6-2 tank 58926. Official closure came on 6 January.

Present
The site of the station has been lost under the A465 road.

References

Notes

Sources

Disused railway stations in Blaenau Gwent
Former London and North Western Railway stations
Railway stations in Great Britain opened in 1864
Railway stations in Great Britain closed in 1958
1864 establishments in Wales
1958 disestablishments in Wales